Jhusi Kohna is a census town in Allahabad district in the Indian state of Uttar Pradesh.

Demographics
 India census, Jhusi Kohna had a population of 16,309. Males constitute 54% of the population and females 46%. Jhusi Kohna has an average literacy rate of 72%, higher than the national average of 59.5%: male literacy is 79%, and female literacy is 64%. In Jhusi Kohna, 11% of the population is under 6 years of age.

References

Cities and towns in Allahabad district